This is a list of prime ministers of New Zealand by age, including when they were born, what age they were when they were appointed prime minister, what age they were when they left the office and the age at which they died, or their current age as of  if they are still alive. The table can be sorted by each different category.

The date of appointment is the date on which they were sworn in by the governor-general for their first term. The day on which they departed office is the final day of their final term. This is either the day a new prime minister was appointed or their date of death if they died whilst in office.

Overview
The oldest living prime minister is Jim Bolger, born 31 May 1935 (aged ). The youngest living former prime minister is Jacinda Ardern, born 26 July 1980 (aged ).

The longest-lived prime minister is also Jim Bolger who is currently aged . Bolger surpassed Grey's lifespan on 6 November 2021. The second oldest-living prime minister, Geoffrey Palmer, will tie Grey if he lives to 27 September 2028. The shortest-lived prime minister was Norman Kirk, who died in office at the age of 51 years, 237 days.

The prime minister with the longest retirement is Robert Stout. He left office on 8 October 1887, and died 42 years, and 284 days later on 19 July 1930. The prime minister with the shortest retirement is Joseph Ward, who died on 8 July 1930, 41 days after he left office on 28 May 1930.

Key:

Records
The three youngest people when they first became prime minister were:
 Edward Stafford37
 Jacinda Ardern37
 Julius Vogel38

The three oldest people when they first became prime minister were:
 Walter Nash75
 Francis Bell74
 George Grey65

The three oldest people to last leave the office of prime minister were:
 Walter Nash78
 Francis Bell74
 Joseph Ward74

The three youngest people to last leave the office of prime minister were:
 Julius Vogel41
 Mike Moore41
 Frederick Weld42

Oldest living prime ministers of New Zealand
Not all prime ministers live to become the oldest of their time. Of the 33 deceased prime ministers, 16 eventually became the oldest of their time, while 17 did not (including all 5 prime ministers who died in office, and 12 others). Jim Bolger has held this distinction since Bill Rowling's death on 31 October 1995 a record  so far. He surpassed the previous record held by Robert Stout on 24 November 2018. Robert Stout became the oldest living prime minister when John Hall died in 1907 and remained so until his death in 1930, for 23 years and 24 days.

John Hall became the oldest living prime minister after the death of George Waterhouse, but he survived Waterhouse by only 323 days.
On one occasion the oldest living prime minister lost this distinction not by his death, but due to the appointment of a prime minister who was older. Sidney Holland ceased to be the oldest living prime minister when Walter Nash was appointed.

 John Hall was the oldest to acquire this distinction at the age of 81 years, and 231 days. Francis Bell, who was 84 years, and 348 days old when he died, was the oldest prime minister to die without ever acquiring this distinction. Mike Moore, who died on 2 February 2020 at 71 years, and 5 days old is the most recent prime minister to die without ever acquiring this distinction.

See also

 List of prime ministers of New Zealand by place of birth

Notes

New Zealand Prime Ministers
Age
New Zealand Prime Ministers
Prime